Fury is an Irish surname.

Real name
 David Fury (born 1959), American television writer and producer
 Ed Fury, (born 1928), American bodybuilder, actor and model born Edmund Holovchik
 George Fury (born 1945), Australian retired rally and racing car driver
 Hughie Fury (born 1994), British boxer
 John Fury (born 1964), Irish former boxer
 Tommy Fury (born 1999), British boxer
 Tyson Fury (born 1988), British boxer
 Warren Fury (born 1985), Welsh international rugby union player.

Stage name
 Billy Fury, English singer

Fictional characters
 Nick Fury, a Marvel Comics character
 Nick Fury Jr, his son
 Nick Fury (Ultimate Marvel character), him in an alternative universe
 Nick Fury (Marvel Cinematic Universe), him in an alternative universe
 Bryan Fury

See also
 Fury (disambiguation)

References